The following lists events that happened during 2015 in the Hashemite Kingdom of Jordan.

Incumbents
Monarch: Abdullah II
Prime Minister: Abdullah Ensour

Events
 January - Clashes between 2,000 protesters and police.
 November - November 9, Amman shooting attack

References

 
2010s in Jordan
Jordan
Years of the 21st century in Jordan
Jordan